The following is a list of squads for each nation competing at the 2022 European Women's Handball Championship.

Each squad consisted of 20 players, and 16 players were selected on the day of each match. There was a maximum of six players who can be replaced during the tournament. However, in regard to the COVID-19 pandemic and the potential risk of several players from the same team testing positive, there was no limit to the number of replacements for players testing positive.

Age, caps and goals correct as of 4 November 2022.

Group A

Croatia
A 20-player squad was announced on 17 October 2022. The final roster was revealed on 2 November 2022.

Head coach: Nenad Šoštarić

Hungary
A 21-player squad was announced on 18 October 2022. The final squad was revealed on 1 November 2022.

Head coach: Vladimir Golovin

Norway
The squad was announced on 11 October 2022.

Head coach:  Þórir Hergeirsson

Switzerland
The squad was announced on 13 October 2022.

Head coach:  Martin Albertsen

Group B

Denmark
The squad was announced on 6 October 2022. On 11 October, Michala Møller replaced Mia Rej in the squad due to a knee injury. On 4 November, Andrea Hansen was added to the squad. 10 days later, Kaja Kamp was added to the squad.

Head coach: Jesper Jensen

Serbia
A 21-player squad was announced on 20 October 2022. The final roster was revealed on 2 November 2022.

Head coach:   Uroš Bregar

Slovenia
A 19-player squad was announced on 24 October 2022.

Head coach:  Dragan Adžić

Sweden
A 21-player squad was announced on 6 October 2022. The final squad was revealed on 31 October 2022. On 7 November Clara Petersson Bergsten replaced Nina Dano due to an injury. Six days later, Linn Hansson replaced Sara Johansson.

Head coach: Tomas Axnér

Group C

France
A 20-player squad was announced on 11 October 2022. On 24 October 2022, it was announced that Laura Glauser had to withdraw from the competition due to a back injury: she was replaced by Camille Depuiset. The final squad was revealed on 2 November 2022.

Head coach: Olivier Krumbholz

Netherlands
The squad was announced on 17 October 2022.

Head coach: Per Johansson

North Macedonia
A 19-player squad was announced on 18 October 2022.

Head coach: Ljubomir Savevski

Romania
The squad was announced on 19 October 2022.

Head coach: Florentin Pera

Group D

Germany
The squad was announced on 13 October 2022. Malina Marie Michalczik and Antje Döll got injured before the tournament and were replaced by Alexia Hauf.

Head coach: Markus Gaugisch

Montenegro
The squad was announced on 24 October 2022.

Head coach: Bojana Popović

Poland
The squad was announced on 11 October 2022.

Head coach:  Arne Senstad

Spain
The squad was announced on 17 October 2022.

Head coach: José Ignacio Prades

Statistics

Coaches representation by country
Coaches in bold represent their own country.

References

squads
European Handball Championship squads